Monty Python Live! is a book detailing the various live performances of the Monty Python team between 1971 and 1980.

Edited by Eric Idle, the book was released in 2009 as part of the team’s 40th anniversary celebrations and features recollections from surviving members John Cleese, Terry Gilliam, Eric Idle, Terry Jones and Michael Palin, alongside archive interviews with Graham Chapman. Also contributing are Python regulars Carol Cleveland and Neil Innes, promoter Tony Smith, US manager Nancy Lewis, biographer Kim Howard Johnson and also Carl Reiner.

The book also contains the script for the 1980 Hollywood Bowl shows (minus the animation and Neil Innes songs), alongside a selection of lesser performed sketches plus some new comedy pieces written specially for the book.

Contents

Foreplay by Eric Idle
Pythons on the Road – An Oral History…Origins – 1971, The Lancaster Arts Festival, CoventryUK Tour – April–May 24, 1973, Monty Python’s First Farewell TourCanada – Summer 1973, Monty Python’s First Farewell Tour of CanadaLondon – March 1974, Monty Python Live at Drury Lane New York – April 14-May 2, 1976, Monty Python Live at City Center Hollywood – September 26–29, 1980, Monty Python Live at the Hollywood Bowl
Monty Python Live at the Hollywood Bowl – Official Programme
Monty Python Live at the Hollywood Bowl – Act IThe LlamaGumby Flower ArrangingMichelangelo and the PopeInternational WrestlingThe Silly OlympicsWorld ForumThe Ministry of Silly WalksThe BrucesCrunchy FrogTravel AgentCustard PieMonty Python Live at the Hollywood Bowl – Act IISit On My FaceCamp JudgesAlbatrossNudge NudgePepperpotsInternational PhilosophyNever Be Rude to an ArabInternational Philosophy Part 2ArgumentI've Got Two LegsFour YorkshiremenFairy TaleParrotSalvation FuzzThe Lumberjack Song
In Their Own Words – the Pythons Recall the Touring YearsJohn Cleese: What I RememberMichael Palin: What I RememberTerry Jones: What I RememberEric Idle: What I RememberGraham Chapman: What He RememberedTerry Gilliam: What I RememberNeil Innes: What I RememberCarol Cleveland: What I RememberCarol Cleveland FAQPython on Broadway
How to be a Great Fucking Actor
Occasionally Performed Pieces – Act IIIAnagramsBee KeeperChildren’s StoryButcher’s ShopHungarian Phrase BookThe Dirty ForkThe Death of Mary, Queen of ScotsHearing AidKen ShabbyMichael Miles Game ShowMinister Falling to PiecesSecret ServiceCocktail BarUndertakerBlackmailCourtroomR.A.F. BanterSilly Election
Book Credits by Stanley Baldwin
Monty Python would like to thank…
Spot the Difference
At Booksellers Near You!

Credits
Writers – Graham Chapman, John Cleese, Terry Gilliam, Eric Idle, Terry Jones, Michael Palin
Contributing writers – Carol Cleveland, Neil Innes, Tony Smith, Nancy Lewis, Kim Howard Johnson, Carl Reiner
Editor – Eric Idle
Art editor – Steve Kirwan

References

Monty Python literature
Simon & Schuster books
2009 non-fiction books